was a Japanese professional sumo wrestler. He became the 48th yokozuna in 1961 at the age of 21, the youngest ever at the time.

Kōki won 32 tournament championships between 1960 and 1971, a record that was unequalled until 2014. His dominance was such that he won six tournaments in a row on two occasions, and he won 45 consecutive matches between 1968 and 1969, which at the time was the best winning streak since Futabayama in the 1930s. He is the only wrestler to win at least one championship every year of his top division career.

He was a popular grand champion, especially amongst women and children. After retiring from active competition, he became a sumo coach, although health problems meant he had limited success.

When Kōki died in January 2013 he was widely cited as the greatest sumo wrestler of the post-war period. Since then Hakuhō, who regarded Taihō as a mentor, surpassed his record by winning his 33rd championship in January 2015.

Early career

Kōki's birth name was Ivan Boryshko. He was born on the island of Sakhalin (Karafuto Prefecture) to a Japanese mother Kiyo Naya and an ethnic Ukrainian father Markiyan Boryshko who had fled the Bolshevik Revolution. However, he is regarded as having come from Teshikaga, Hokkaidō, where he moved to as a child after the Soviet Union took control of Sakhalin in 1945. While on a sumo tour to the Soviet Union in 1965 he tried to locate his father, but without success. Taihō was the first of three great yokozuna who all hailed from Hokkaidō, the most northerly of the main islands of Japan and who among them dominated sumo during the 1960s, 1970s and 1980s. The others were Kitanoumi and Chiyonofuji.

He entered sumo in September 1956, joining Nishonoseki stable. He initially fought under his real name of Naya Kōki. Upon promotion to the second jūryō division in May 1959 he was given the shikona (ring name) of "Taihō", meaning "Great peng" ("peng" is often translated to "phoenix"). Taihō rapidly rose through the ranks after his debut in the top makuuchi division in January 1960. He was a runner-up in his first top division tournament and was awarded the Fighting Spirit prize. At sekiwake rank in November 1960 he won the first of his former record 32 tournament championships and earned promotion to ōzeki. Following two consecutive tournament victories (his second and third) he became a yokozuna in September 1961, less than two years after his top division debut. Because the island of Sakhalin is/was claimed as a Japanese territory, Taihō is not considered the first non-Japanese yokozuna.

Yokozuna
At the time of his promotion Taihō was the youngest wrestler ever to have achieved sumo's highest rank of yokozuna aged 21 years and three months, a record subsequently surpassed by Kitanoumi who was one month younger. In a fashion which is considered to be exceptional for a newly promoted yokozuna he also managed to win his first tournament subsequent to his promotion. He was promoted simultaneously with Kashiwado, and their rivalry created what became known as the Hakuhō era. Although Kashiwado was to win only five tournament championships, Taihō was to remark, "There was Taihō because there was Kashiwado. There was Kashiwado because there was Taihō." Outside of competition they had a genuine friendship, which continued until Kashiwado's death in 1996.

Taihō outperformed Kashiwado very quickly, and during his tenure in sumo's highest rank he was dominant, especially in the early part of his career. Until 2005—when the 68th yokozuna Asashōryū bettered his record—he was the only post-war yokozuna to have achieved six tournament victories consecutively, a feat he managed on two separate occasions. Eight of Taihō's championships were achieved with a perfect record of 15 wins and no losses (zenshō-yūshō), a record that stood until 2013 when it was broken by Hakuhō. He came back from withdrawing from or missing five straight tournaments to win the championship in September 1968 with a 14–1 record and embarked on a 45 bout winning streak. It was broken in March 1969 only after an incorrect decision by the judges, which caused such a furor that video replays were introduced after the incident.

His final championship came in January 1971 after a playoff with Tamanoumi, maintaining his record of winning at least one championship every year of his top division career. He had a good score of 12–3 in the following tournament, but announced his retirement five days into the May 1971 tournament after losing to the promising young wrestler Takanohana for the second time. He had been a yokozuna for nearly ten years. His career win ratio was in excess of 80%, which is also a post-war record. He became the first former rikishi to be offered (and accept) membership of the Japan Sumo Association without having to purchase a share (ichidai toshiyori), in recognition of his great achievements.

After retirement

Taihō branched off from his old heya and opened Taihō stable in December 1971. In February 1977, at the age of 36, he suffered a stroke, and his subsequent health problems may have played a part in him being passed over for the chairmanship of the Sumo Association. He had extensive rehabilitation sessions to get the left side of his body moving again. In general he did not manage to replicate his own wrestling success as a trainer, but he did produce Ōzutsu, a sekiwake who fought in 78 consecutive top division tournaments from 1979 to 1992. He had his kanreki dohyō-iri ceremony to mark his 60th birthday in 2000, although his restricted mobility meant he could not perform it in full. In May 2002 Taihō recruited the Russian wrestler Rohō. He handed over control of his stable to his son-in-law, ex-sekiwake Takatōriki, in February 2003.

Taihō reached the mandatory retirement age of 65 in May 2005 and became the curator of the Sumo Museum at the Ryōgoku Kokugikan. He still maintained close contact with his old stable, inviting yokozuna Hakuhō to train there in May 2008.

Taihō was awarded the Medal with Purple Ribbon by the Japanese government in 2004. In November 2009, he was one of 15 people to receive the Person of Cultural Merit award from the Japanese government, becoming the first sumo wrestler to be so honoured.

After suffering a stroke at 36 in 1977, Taihō used a wheelchair in the last stage of his life. He died of heart failure in a Tokyo hospital on January 19, 2013, at the age of 72. His death was announced by the Japan Sumo Association. In its obituary, Nikkan Sports named him "the strongest yokozuna in history." In February 2013, he posthumously became the second sumo wrestler to be commended with the People's Honour Award, with Yoshihide Suga calling him a "national hero." After winning the March 2013 championship, Hakuhō urged the crowd to get to their feet and honour Taihō's memory with a moment of silence. He said that Taihō gave him regular advice, and told him that records are meant to be broken. Hakuhō would indeed surpass Taihō's all-time championship record by winning his 33rd yushō in January 2015, two years after Taihō's death.

Fighting style
Taihō was noted for his skill and power when he grabbed his opponents' mawashi or belt– techniques known as yotsu-sumo. His preferred grip was hidari-yotsu, a right hand outside, left hand inside position. His most common winning move was yori-kiri, a straightforward force out, which accounted for about 30 percent of his wins. His most frequently used throws were sukuinage (the beltless scoop throw) and uwatenage (the overarm throw).

He was particularly diligent about training, and was known to invite every new member of the top division to train with him.

Family
He married in 1966 at the height of his fame (coincidentally, the final day of the May Tournament that year, which he won, was also his 26th birthday), to the daughter of a ryokan proprietor. Their lavish reception at the Imperial Hotel was attended by 1000 guests and over 200 reporters. He was the first to hold a press conference afterwards, now a common occurrence with sumo marriages.

Taihō's youngest daughter married the former sekiwake Takatoriki, who took over the running of Taihō stable (renamed Ōtake stable) after Taihō's retirement. When Ōtake was dismissed from sumo after a gambling scandal, he divorced Taihō's daughter. Taihō's grandson Konosuke Naya (born 2000) joined Ōtake stable as a professional sumo wrestler in January 2018, using Naya as his shikona. He was followed into sumo by his brothers Kosei in November 2019 and Takamori in March 2020. Taihō's fourth and eldest grandson, Yukio Naya (born 1994), is a professional wrestler.

Career record
The Kyushu tournament was first held in 1957, and the Nagoya tournament in 1958.

See also
Kanreki dohyo-iri
List of sumo record holders
List of sumo tournament top division champions
List of sumo tournament top division runners-up
List of sumo tournament second division champions
List of yokozuna
Glossary of sumo terms
List of past sumo wrestlers

References

External links

Japan Sumo Association profile

Japanese sumo wrestlers
1940 births
2013 deaths
Sumo people from Hokkaido
Japanese people of Ukrainian descent
Yokozuna
People's Honour Award winners
Recipients of the Medal with Purple Ribbon